Kelly Blair LaBounty (born November 24, 1970) is a retired American track and field Olympic athlete.

Collegiate career
Kelly Blair LaBounty attended the University of Oregon playing two sports, basketball and track and field. After two seasons she decided her basketball career would have to come to an end to focus on track. At Oregon she won a national title in the heptathlon in 1993.

Olympics
Blair LaBounty placed sixth in the women's heptathlon in the 1996 Olympic Games held in Atlanta, Georgia, and also qualified for the 2000 Summer Olympics, but missed the games due to injury. She defeated Jackie Joyner-Kersee in the Olympic trials of 1996. Blair LaBounty placed third in the 1998 Goodwill Games in the heptathlon.

Post-competitive career
She now lives in Eugene, Oregon, with her two sons Jacob and Lucas and her husband, former National Football League defensive end Matt LaBounty. She was hired as an assistant coach at the University of Oregon in 2006, and served in that capacity until her position was eliminated in 2008.

She was named to the University of Oregon Athletic Hall of Fame in 2004, and the Oregon Sports Hall of Fame in 2011.

References

Living people
1970 births
Sportspeople from Eugene, Oregon
People from Prosser, Washington
Track and field athletes from Washington (state)
American heptathletes
World Athletics Championships athletes for the United States
Olympic track and field athletes of the United States
Athletes (track and field) at the 1996 Summer Olympics
Oregon Ducks women's track and field athletes
Universiade medalists in athletics (track and field)
Goodwill Games medalists in athletics
Oregon Ducks track and field coaches
Universiade bronze medalists for the United States
Competitors at the 1998 Goodwill Games